Psychotria nervosa, also known as Seminole balsamo or wild coffee, is a shade tolerant medium-sized shrub native to Florida as well as the West Indies and Central and South America. It produces a "small, red, ellipsoid fruit" that resembles "the true coffee bean" in shape and attract birds. Its maximum height ranges from approximately 4–10 feet.

Despite its common name of wild coffee, this species is not known to contain any caffeine. In recounting anecdotes from others, the Florida ethnobotanist, Dan Austin, reported that the use of the seeds as a coffee substitute resulted in "only bad taste and terrible headaches." A similar account reported no known usage as a coffee substitute in Jamaica and noted the morphological similarity of its seed to coffee, the more likely reason for its common name being wild coffee. Reports of DMT in this species are also unsubstantiated.

References

Flora of Florida
nervosa
Plants described in 1788
Taxa named by Olof Swartz